Bihar is a state situated in Eastern India. It is surrounded by West Bengal to the east, Uttar Pradesh to the west, Jharkhand to the south and Nepal to the north.

History

Magadha, Anga and Vajjika League of Mithila, c. 600 BCE.

Bengal Presidency 
Before 1905, Bihar was a part of British East India Company's Bengal Presidency. In 1905 the Bengal Presidency was divided and created two new provinces: East Bengal and West Bengal. Until then Bihar was part of West Bengal. Again West Bengal and East Bengal reunited in 1911 but the people of Bihar and Orrisa demanded a separate province based on language rather than religion. In 1912 Bihar and Orissa Province was created separating from Bengal Presidency. In 1936, Bihar and Orrisa Province divided into two new provinces: Bihar Province and Orissa Province.

Bihar and Orissa Province
Following Divisions were included in Bihar and Orissa Province when it separated from Bengal Presidency in 1912:

Bhagalpur Division (districts of Bhagalpur, Munger (Monghyr), Purnea and the Sonthal Parganas)
Patna Division (Gaya, Patna and Shahabad)
Tirhut Division (Champaran, Darbhanga, Muaffarpur and Saran)
Chota Nagpur Division (Hazaribagh, Manbhum, Palamau, Ranchi and Singhbhum)
Orissa Division (Angul, Balasore, Cuttack, Puri and Sambatpur)

On 1 April 1936 Bihar and Orissa Province was divided into two new provinces: Bihar Province and Orissa Province

Bihar Province 
In 1936, Bihar became a separate province including part of Jharkhand.

After the independence of India in 1951, Bihar including Jharkhand had 18 divisions, and had 55 districts in 1991.

Bihar
In 2000, Bihar again divided into two states: the current Bihar and Jharkhand. In 2001 Bihar had a total of 38 districts.

Administrative structure

Structure

Divisions and Districts

There are 38 districts in Bihar, grouped into 9 divisions —Patna, Tirhut, Saran, Darbhanga, Kosi, Purnia, Bhagalpur, Munger and Magadh —are as listed below.

Sub-divisions

Sub-divisions (Anumandal) in Bihar are like sub-districts. There are 101 subdivisions in Bihar.

Blocks

The Indian state of Bihar is divided into 534 CD Block called blocks.

Urban Local Government

Municipal Bodies 
As per Census 2011, Bihar is the second least urbanised state in the country, with a rate of urbanisation of 11.3%, as compared to the national rate of 31.16%. The state has 139 StatutoryTowns and 60 Census Towns.

For the administration of the urban areas, Bihar has 12 municipal corporations, 49 nagar parishads (city councils), and 80 nagar panchayats (town councils). Bihar has one municipal act to establish and govern all municipalities in the state: Bihar Municipal Act, 2007.

As per a 2017 report by the Comptroller and Auditor General of India, Urban Local Bodies (ULBs) in Bihar carry out 12 out of 18 functions, and the remaining 6 are carried out by Bihar state government departments. The Fifth Bihar State Finance Commission report states that the ULB funds are ‘grossly inadequate for their assigned functions, they are unable to utilize even that’.

The Bihar Municipal Act, 2007 creates the following categories of urban areas based on their population. All three types of urban areas must have at least 75% of their population engaged in non-agricultural work.

Further, depending on the population size, the Act prescribes the minimum and maximum number of councillors/wards allowed within each type of local government.

The Act mentions the following key positions as well as committees for ULBs:

Ward Committees
Bihar Municipal Act, 2007 mandates the establishment of Ward Committees through the Bihar Urban Local Body (Community Participation) Rules, 2013. Section 31 of the Bihar Municipal Act, 2007 mandates the establishment of Ward Committees for each ward of a municipality. The ward level elected councillor would be the chairperson of their respective Ward Committee. Up to 10 representatives from the civil society belonging to the ward would be nominated into the committee by the ULB.

Even though the creation of ward committees is mandated in municipalities, they have not been formed in Bihar.

Government

Like other states in India, the head of state of Bihar is the Governor, appointed by the President of India on the advice of the central government. His or her post is largely ceremonial. The Chief Minister is the head of government and is vested with most of the executive powers. Patna is the capital of Bihar.

The Patna High Court, located in Patna, has jurisdiction over the whole state. The present legislative structure of Bihar is bicameral. The Legislative houses are the Bihar Vidhan Sabha (Bihar Legislative Assembly) and Bihar Vidhan Parishad (Bihar Legislative Council). Their normal term is five years, unless dissolved earlier.

Legislature 

Bihar is one of the six states where bicameral legislature exists. Other states are Uttar Pradesh, Karnataka, Maharashtra, Telangana and Andhra Pradesh. The Vidhan Parishad serves as the upper house and Vidhan Sabha serves as the lower house of a bicameral legislature. The current strength of the Bihar Vidhan Parishad is 75 (63 Elected + 12 Nominated) is a permanent body. The current strength of the Bihar Vidhan Sabha is 243 and is not a permanent body which means it is subject to dissolution.

Judiciary

High court 

The Patna High Court is the High Court of the state of Bihar and was established on 9 February 1916 and later affiliated under the Government of India Act 1915. The Patna High Court is the principle civil courts in Bihar. However, a high court exercises its original civil and criminal jurisdiction only if the subordinate courts are not authorized by law to try such matters for lack of pecuniary, territorial jurisdiction. High courts may also enjoy original jurisdiction in certain matters, if so designated especially in a state or federal law. The Patna High Court has 53 Judges which includes 40 permanent and 13 additional judges.

City Courts

See also
Administration in India
Government of Bihar
Divisions of Bihar
Districts in Bihar

References

External links
 Official government website

Government of Bihar